Recherches husserliennes was a Belgian French-speaking journal devoted to Husserlian-style phenomenological philosophy. Founded in 1994 by Robert Brisart, the review ceased publication in 2006. It was headquartered in Brussels.

References

External links
 List of issues, content from 1994-2006

1994 establishments in Belgium
2006 disestablishments in Belgium
Magazines published in Belgium
Defunct magazines published in Belgium
French-language magazines
Magazines established in 1994
Magazines disestablished in 2006
Philosophy magazines
Magazines published in Brussels